Edmundsella pedata is a species of sea slug, an aeolid nudibranch, a marine gastropod mollusc in the family Flabellinidae.

Description
This species has a distinctive pink-purple coloration over its entire body. In the Mediterranean it can grow to about 20 mm long, while specimens in the Atlantic Ocean may grow to 50 mm. The cerata have white rings at the tip and occur in bunches which are joined together at their bases. The extremities are an opaque white in colour. Normally, the digestive gland is red.

Distribution
Edmundsella pedata is found as far north as Trøndelag, Norway, around the entire British Isles, and down to the Mediterranean. Although it is a common species, it is seldom found in abundance.

Habitat
This species occurs, often solitary or in pairs, in sublittoral areas on hard substrate such as somewhat exposed rocky surfaces.

Diet
This sea slug eats Eudendrium (a kind of Hydrozoa). The exact species has been unclear, but in Denmark it is reportedly E. ramosum. It also lays a thin white egg ribbon or thread on the Eudendrium.

References

 Gofas, S.; Le Renard, J.; Bouchet, P. (2001). Mollusca. in: Costello, M.J. et al. (Ed.) (2001). European register of marine species: a check-list of the marine species in Europe and a bibliography of guides to their identification. Collection Patrimoines Naturels. 50: pp. 180–213.

External links

 

Flabellinidae
Gastropods described in 1815